Victor Hugo Ascarrunz Fonseca Jr. (born 22 December 1960) is a Bolivian alpine skier. He competed in two events at the 1980 Winter Olympics.

References

External links
 

1960 births
Living people
Bolivian male alpine skiers
Olympic alpine skiers of Bolivia
Alpine skiers at the 1980 Winter Olympics
Sportspeople from Pasadena, California